Olivella fletcherae is a species of small sea snail, marine gastropod mollusk in the subfamily Olivellinae, in the family Olividae, the olives.  Species in the genus Olivella are commonly called dwarf olives.

Description

Distribution
O. fletcherae is found on the west coast of Panama and Mexico.

References

fletcherae
Gastropods described in 1958